Marty O'Connell (born 13 April 1979) is an Australian former professional rugby league footballer who played in the 1990s and 2000s. He played for the Penrith Panthers in the NRL.

Playing career
O'Connell was a Penrith junior. He made his first grade debut from the bench in his side's 28−0 loss to the Brisbane Broncos at ANZ Stadium in round 14 of the 1999 season. He played in 2 more games for the Penrith Panthers during the 2001 NRL season which includes a victory over the Canberra Raiders and a loss to Melbourne Storm in round 23 and 24 respectively. The Panthers finished the 2001 season with the wooden spoon. O'Connell was released by the Panthers at the end of the 2001 season, and subsequently never played first-grade rugby league again.

References

1979 births
Living people
Australian rugby league players
Penrith Panthers players
Rugby league wingers
Rugby league players from Penrith, New South Wales